Sidley is a village on the outskirts of Bexhill-on-Sea in East Sussex, England. Its governance falls within the jurisdiction of the Charter Trustees town of Bexhill. It is also a ward of Rother district council.

It is home to 2 primary schools.

Sport and leisure
Sidley has a Non-League football club Sidley United F.C. who play at Gullivers Sports Ground, named after the farmer who donated the ground for sporting activity, where they share with Sidley Cricket Club.

Sidley United FC now play their football in the Mid-Sussex Championship against teams such as Nutley FC, West Hoathly FC, Crawley Devils FC and Ashurst Wood FC

References

External links

Populated places in East Sussex
Bexhill-on-Sea